The 2005–06 2. Bundesliga was the 32nd season of the 2. Bundesliga, the second tier of the German football league system. VfL Bochum, Alemannia Aachen and Energie Cottbus were promoted to the Bundesliga while Dynamo Dresden, 1. FC Saarbrücken, LR Ahlen and Sportfreunde Siegen were relegated to the Regionalliga.

League table
For the 2005–06 season Eintracht Braunschweig, SC Paderborn 07, Kickers Offenbach and Sportfreunde Siegen were newly promoted to the 2. Bundesliga from the Regionalliga while VfL Bochum, F.C. Hansa Rostock and SC Freiburg had been relegated to the league from the Bundesliga.

Results

Top scorers 
The league's top scorers:

References

External links
 Official Bundesliga site  
 2. Bundesliga @ DFB 
 kicker.de 

2. Bundesliga seasons
2005–06 in German football leagues
Germany